Thompson and Company Cigar Factory is a national historic site located at 255 North Third Street, Bartow, Florida in Polk County. It was used by the Thompson Cigar, established in Florida in 1915.

It was added to the National Register of Historic Places on August 9, 2002.

References

National Register of Historic Places in Polk County, Florida
Buildings and structures in Bartow, Florida